Mohanpur is a village in the Mohanpur CD block in the Kharagpur subdivision of the Paschim Medinipur district in the state of West Bengal, India.

Geography

Location

Area overview
Kharagpur subdivision, shown partly in the map alongside, mostly has alluvial soils, except in two CD blocks in the west – Kharagpur I and Keshiary, which mostly have lateritic soils. Around 74% of the total cultivated area is cropped more than once. With a density of population of 787 per km2nearly half of the district’s population resides in this subdivision. 14.33% of the population lives in urban areas and 86.67% lives in the rural areas.

Note: The map alongside presents some of the notable locations in the subdivision. All places marked in the map are linked in the larger full screen map.

Demographics
According to the 2011 Census of India Mohanpur had a total population of 6,049 of which 3,093 (51%) were males and 2,956 (49%) were females. Population in the age range 0–6 years was 613. The total number of literate persons in Mohanpur was 4,306 (71.19% of the population over 6 years).

Civic administration

CD block HQ
The headquarters of Mohanpur CD block are located at Mohanpur.

Police station
Mohanpur police station has jurisdiction over Mohanpur  CD block.

Transport
The Egra-Solpatta Road passes through Mohanpur.

References

Villages in Paschim Medinipur district